Christian Murchison (born 1 November 1980, in Singapore) is a Singaporean race car driver.

In 2003, Murchison finished 10th in the Eurocup Formula Renault V6 Championship. In 2000 and 2001, he was the runner-up in the Australian Formula Holden Championship for two year consecutive years. He finished 5th in the Australian Formula Ford Championship in 1999, and won the West Australian Formula Ford Championship in 1998. He was named "Rookie of the Year" in Formula Holden in 2000 and in Formula Ford in 1998. In six years of competitive kart racing from 1992–98, he won five West Australian state titles.

In 2006, Murchison was selected to drive for the newly formed A1 Team Singapore for the A1 Grand Prix of Nations 2006-7 season.  He repaid the team's management by scoring the team's first points in Singapore's third A1 GP event by finishing 8th on the Beijing Street Circuit.

Murchison has also dabbled in V8 Supercars endurance events. In 2000, he drove for the Castrol Perkins Engineering Holden Commodore's, and again in 2007, this time for the Brad Jones' BOC Ford Falcon team. He has three V8 starts to his name, with the fourth - the 2007 Bathurst 1000 - cut short due to a severe accident for co-driver Damien White in Friday practice.

Murchison was born in Singapore in 1980, but moved with his family to Perth, Australia, in 1991, where he began his motor-racing career. Though required by law, Murchison has never discharged his national service liability. Because of this, he has not visited Singapore for several years and is not able to enter the country without facing the possibility of arrest.

Career results

Complete A1 Grand Prix results
(key) (Races in bold indicate pole position) (Races in italics indicate fastest lap)

Complete V8 Supercar results

Complete Bathurst 1000 results

External links 
 christianmurchison.com
 Driver Database stats
 Profile at speedsportmag.com
 Profile at conrod.com.au
 Motorsport.com articles & pictures

1980 births
Living people
Singaporean racing drivers
Formula Ford drivers
Formula Holden drivers
A1 Team Singapore drivers
Supercars Championship drivers
A1 Grand Prix drivers
Formula Renault V6 Eurocup drivers
DAMS drivers